Killian Lokembo Lokaso (born 6 June 2002) is a Belgian professional footballer who plays for Belgian National Division 1 club Zébra Élites, which is the second squad of Charleroi.

Club career 
Killian Lokembo made his professional debut for Charleroi on the 27 December 2021, starting the Division 1A game against OH Leuven as a right-back.

Private life 
Killian Lokembo is the son of Fabrice Lokembo, a former Sporting Charleroi player and RDC international.

References

External links

Sporting Charleroi profile
Pro League profile

2002 births
Living people
Belgian footballers
Belgian people of Democratic Republic of the Congo descent
Belgium youth international footballers
Association football defenders
R. Charleroi S.C. players
Belgian Pro League players